Sarah Ćosić (born 14 April 1989) is a Croatian model and beauty pageant titleholder who was crowned Miss Universe Hrvatske 2009. She was represented her country in the Miss Universe 2009 and was placed Top 15.

Early life
Ćosić works as a model in Split, Croatia.

Pageantry

Miss Universe Hrvatske 2009
Ćosić was crowned as Miss Universe Hrvatske 2009.

Miss Universe 2009
Ćosić was competed at the Miss Universe 2009 in Bahamas. She was the first Croatian representative to place in Miss Universe.

References

External links
Official Miss Universe Hrvatske website

1989 births
Croatian beauty pageant winners
Croatian female models
Living people
Miss Universe 2009 contestants
Models from Split, Croatia